Bonnie Root (born August 24, 1975) is an American actress. She is primarily known for her recurring guest role in the CBS series Cold Case as ADA Alexandra Thomas and for her role in the soap As the World Turns as the serial killer Eve Coleman Browning. She has guest-starred on various other crime shows, including Without a Trace, CSI: Crime Scene Investigation and The Mentalist.

Personal life
Root lives in Los Angeles, California.

Filmography

Film

Television

References

External links

1975 births
American film actresses
American television actresses
Living people
Actresses from Portland, Oregon
21st-century American women